Derek Schofield (born 20 February 1945), is a British lawyer and the former Chief Justice of Gibraltar. He commenced his legal career in 1961 when he was appointed assistant in the office of the clerk of the court in Lancashire. He was called to the bar in 1970, at Gray's Inn in London.

He has served as the Senior Judge in the Cayman Islands, and a high court judge in Kenya.

In 1996 he was appointed Chief Justice of the Supreme Court of Gibraltar. He was suspended from this position while a Tribunal of inquiry was held in Gibraltar, estimated to have cost around £2 million. The inquiry submitted a report to the Governor of Gibraltar, who referred the matter to the Judicial Committee of the Privy Council in London. This held hearings between 15 and 18 June 2009 to consider the question of his removal as Chief Justice of Gibraltar due to misbehaviour and inability.

He is married to human rights lawyer Anne Schofield, and has four children.

He is known for his strong support of human rights and the independence of the judiciary which led him to resign as high court judge and leave Kenya with his family in 1987 when he refused to be influenced by strong political interference in a case.

During his term as Chief Justice of the Supreme Court of Gibraltar, he made several significant decisions, including the ruling that it is unconstitutional for jury service to be compulsory only for men. The decision was reversed on appeal and then went to the Privy Council, who overturned the Gibraltar Government objection of equality for women in jury service.

There were also a number of controversies over his conduct, which led to his suspension and subsequent removal from office.

Controversies
Since his appointment as Chief Justice of Gibraltar, he had been involved in high-profile disputes that he has actively pursued with Chief Minister Peter Caruana. The Tribunal of Inquiry, appointed by the Governor to look into whether his appointment should be referred to the Privy Council, reported that they found that Chief Justice Schofield misbehaved in his pursuit of these disputes and was unable to perform the duties of Chief Justice of Gibraltar.

Chief Justice Schofield has been publicly critical of the Judicial Reforms introduced by the UK Government and Gibraltar Social Democrats administration through the new Constitution of Gibraltar and the Judicial Services Act. These criticisms centred on the replacement of the Chief Justice by the President of the Court of Appeal as Head of the Judiciary and the creation of a Judicial Services Commission to oversee the judiciary, which he has claimed, in the face of much learned opposition, can be controlled too easily by the Executive and in his view posed a threat to judicial independence. This stance has been heavily criticised by the Tribunal report.

After the introduction of the new Constitution by the UK Government followed by the enactment of the Judicial Services Act, Chief Justice Schofield launched a Judicial Review into the changes. He subsequently withdrew this Judicial Review. A large costs order was made against him consequently by the very Court over which he presided over until his suspension. He has paid these costs.

The Tribunal report is critical of Chief Justice Schofield for having taken this Judicial Review. He purported to have cancelled the Ceremonial Opening of the Legal Year (for which he is also criticised by the Tribunal report) without success as it was held by the newly appointed Head of the Judiciary. The dispute escalated further to involve leading members of the Gibraltar legal profession who intended proposing a vote of no confidence in the Chief Justice. The motion was never put and instead a complaint was made to the Governor.

This complaint led to the Governor appointing the Tribunal to inquire into his removal for inability and misbehaviour. The Tribunal delivered a report suggesting there were grounds for his removal. Chief Justice Schofield was represented at the Tribunal hearings by Edward Fitzgerald QC, the Tribunal by Tim Otty QC, the Government by James Eadie QC and the Gibraltar lawyers who complained by Antony White QC with Robert Vasquez, a partner of Triay & Triay, lawyers in Gibraltar.

Anne Schofield instructed a local barrister Charles Gomez to launch a libel lawsuit against Bar Association Chairman James Neish for making allegedly defamatory statements. Charles Gomez, having earlier ended his representation of her, she subsequently withdrew this lawsuit and now faces paying a substantial costs order made against her by the Supreme Court. This led to a bankruptcy notice issued against her, but proceedings have not commenced.

Mrs Schofield has petitioned the European Court alleging breaches of her right to a fair trial and discrimination. Mrs Schofield has to pay £45,000 in costs after the Privy Council declined an application from her to appeal. In a statement she still alleges that the judge who heard her case Sir Michael Turner, should have recused himself because of what she claims are interests that could make him partial.

Alfred A. Vasquez Q.C., also a partner of Triay & Triay, represented both the Government of Gibraltar to oppose the Chief Justice's Judicial Review and James Neish in Mrs Schofield's defamation action.

On 17 September 2007 Schofield was suspended on full pay pending the inquiry into his removal from office. It has been reported that at one earlier moment in time he was offered full remuneration until his retirement in return for his resignation, but that he declined this offer.

Tribunal
A tribunal was convened in Gibraltar, chaired by Lord Cullen with Sir Peter Gibson and Sir Jonathan Parker, to determine whether to refer his appointment to the Privy Council. The full Inquiry report, which recommended that his appointment should be reviewed, along with the daily transcript and other documents regarding the dispute is available from the Gibraltar Chronicle document repository site.

There are mixed views over the report of the tribunal, which it is claimed went further than its mandate and made a string of assumptions which it is claimed "show how little grasp of the local social and political situation the three judges actually had."

On 18 November 2008 the Governor of Gibraltar released a statement that he had referred the case to the Judicial Committee of the Privy Council.

Privy Council
The Privy Council cancelled the original hearing of this matter which was scheduled for 27–29 January 2009.

In June 2009 of the Privy Council considered the matter. The Governor was represented by Tim Otty QC, the Government of Gibraltar by James Eady QC, the Gibraltar lawyers who complained appeared as litigants in person, by Robert Vasquez of Triay & Triay, lawyers in Gibraltar. Chief Justice Schofield was represented by the Hon Michael Beloff QC from Blackstone Chambers and Paul Stanley from Essex Court Chambers and briefed by Mr Charles Gomez from Gibraltar.

On 12 November 2009 the Privy Council judgement was released in which by a 4:3 majority they supported the removal of the Chief Justice from office.

Removal from office
On 17 November 2009 the following notice was issued:

"Acting on the advice received from the Judicial Service Commission, HE The Governor, Sir Adrian Johns, has today carried out the removal by means of dismissal of Mr Justice Schofield from the office of Chief Justice."

See also
Court system of Gibraltar
Chief Justice of Gibraltar

References

External links
International Commission of Jurists - Attacks on justice 2002 - Gibraltar
Vox "Bar Wars Aggravated by Caruana Publication of Contentious Legal Reforms" (May 2007)
Vox - "Schofield Drops Call for Review" (December 2007)
Vox - Experts Vindicate Schofield’s Constitution Doubts (November 2006)
Vox - Schofield Stirs Up A Storm (August 2006)
Panorama - Police to Investigate Phone Tapping Claims at Home of Chief Justice (May 2000)
The Nation (Nairobi) - "Ex-Kenyan Judge Gets More Support" (November 2007)
Vox - "A Further Step on the Slippery Slope to Dictatorship?" (February 2007)
Gibraltar Chronicle - Transcripts of Tribunal Proceedings
Daily Nation (Nairobi) - Judge Schofield fights on for the cause of justice (October 2008) 

Living people
1945 births
Chief justices of Gibraltar
Caymanian judges
British judges on the courts of Kenya
20th-century Gibraltarian judges
21st-century Gibraltarian judges